The Mayor of Parañaque is the chief executive of the government of Parañaque in  Metro Manila, Philippines. The mayor leads the city's departments in executing ordinances and delivering public services. The mayorship is a three-year term and each mayor is restricted to three consecutive terms, totaling nine years, although a mayor can be elected again after an interruption of one term.

The current mayor of Parañaque is Eric Olivarez.

List 

 Served in acting capacity.

References 

Parañaque
Parañaque